Drosophila suzukii, commonly called the spotted wing drosophila or SWD, is a fruit fly. D. suzukii, originally from southeast Asia, is becoming a major pest species in America and Europe, because it infests fruit early during the ripening stage, in contrast with other Drosophila species that infest only rotting fruit.

Native to east Asia, D. suzukii was first described in 1931 by Matsumura, it was observed in Japan as early as 1916 by T. Kanzawa.

D. suzukii is a fruit crop pest and is a serious economic threat to soft summer fruit; i.e., cherries, blueberries, raspberries, blackberries, peaches, nectarines, apricots, grapes, and others. Research investigating the specific threat D. suzukii poses to these fruit is ongoing.

Description
Its body is yellow to brown with darker bands on the abdomen and it has red eyes. The male has a distinct dark spot near the tip of each wing; females do not have the spotted wing. The foreleg of the male sports dark bands on the first and second tarsi. The female has a long, sharp, serrated ovipositor. The larvae are small, white, and cylindrical reaching  in length.

When first observed in a new region, D. suzukii has often been confused with the western cherry fruit fly (Rhagoletis indifferens) and was given the short-lasting name cherry vinegar fly. The cherry fruit fly is significantly larger than D. suzukii (up to ) and has a pattern of dark bands on its wings instead of the telltale spot of D. suzukii. The telltale spots on the wings of male D. suzukii have earned it the common name "spotted wing drosophila" (SWD).

Unlike its vinegar fly relatives which are primarily attracted to rotting or fermented fruit, female D. suzukii attack fresh, ripe fruit by using their saw-like ovipositor to lay eggs under the fruit's soft skin. The larvae hatch and grow in the fruit, destroying the fruit's commercial value.  Economic impacts are significant; losses from large scale infestation (20% loss) across the US alone could equate to farm gate impacts > $500M.

D. suzukii has a slow rate of evolution due to its lower number of generations per year, because it enters winter diapause.

Distribution 
Native to southeast Asia, D. suzukii was first described in 1931 by Matsumura. Observed in Japan as early as 1916 by T. Kanzawa, it was widely observed throughout parts of Japan, Korea, and China by the early 1930s.  By the 1980s, the "fruit fly" with the spotted wings was seen in Hawaii. It first appeared in North America in central California in August 2008, then was found in Oregon and Washington State by Lee et al., 2011 in the Pacific Northwest in 2009, and is now widespread throughout California's coastal counties, western Oregon, western Washington, and parts of British Columbia and Florida. During the summer of 2010 the fly was discovered for the first time in South Carolina, North Carolina, Louisiana, and Utah. In Fall 2010 the fly was also discovered in Michigan and Wisconsin.  The fly was first discovered in the northeastern states in 2011 and in Minnesota and Idaho in 2012. As  D. suzukii continues to spread, most of the states will most likely observe it. The pest has also been found in Europe, including the countries of Belgium, Italy, France, and Spain.

Lifecycle
The lifespan of D. suzukii varies greatly between generations; from a few weeks to ten months. Generations hatched early in the year have shorter lifespans than generations hatched after September. Research shows that many of the males and most of the females of the late-hatching generations overwinter in captivity—some living as long as 300 days. Only adults overwinter successfully in the research conducted thus far. In Washington state, D. suzukii has been observed in association with two exotic and well-established species of blackberry, Rubus armeniacus (= Rubus discolor) and Rubus laciniatus (the Himalayan and Evergreen Blackberries, respectively.). The fly has been observed reproducing on many other species of soft-skinned wild fruit, however, research is still ongoing to determine the quality of individual species as reproductive hosts.

The fertilized female searches for ripe fruit, lands on the fruit, inserts its serrated ovipositor to pierce the skin and deposits a clutch of 1 to 3 eggs per insertion. Females will oviposit on many fruits and in regions of scarce fruit, many females will oviposit on the same fruit. In captivity in Japan, research shows up to 13 generations of D. suzukii may hatch per season. A female may lay as many as 300 eggs during its lifespan. With as many as 13 generations per season, and the ability for the female to lay up to 300 eggs each, the potential population size of D. suzukii is huge.

The larvae grow inside the fruit. The oviposition site is visible in many fruit by a small pore scar in the skin of the fruit often called a "sting". After 1 or 2 days, the area around the "sting" softens and depresses creating an increasingly visible blemish. The depressions may also exude fluid which may attract infection by secondary bacterial and fungal pathogens. Larvae may leave the fruit, or remain inside it, to pupate.

Economic impact 
The economic impact of D. suzukii on fruit crops is negative and significantly affects a wide variety of summer fruit in the United States including cherries, blueberries, grapes, nectarines, pears, plums, pluots, peaches, raspberries, and strawberries, and blackberries. Damage was first noticed in North America in the western states of California, Oregon, and Washington in 2008; yield loss estimates from that year vary widely, with negligible loss in some areas to 80% loss in others depending on location and crop. The $500 million actual loss due to pest damage in 2008—the first year D. suzukii was observed in California—is an indication of the potential damage the pest can cause upon introduction to a new location. Economic losses have now been reported across North America and in Europe as the fly has spread to new areas.  In 2015 it is estimated that national economic loss for producers in the United States was $700 million. Future losses may decrease as growers learn how to better control the pest, or may keep increasing as the fly continues to spread.

Agricultural management 

Due to the impact of D. suzukii on soft fruits, farmers have started to monitor and control it. There are different types of traps, both commercial and home-made, that are effective in monitoring it. Traps that use apple cider vinegar with a bait made of whole wheat dough have been successful for farmers for both capture and monitoring. Farmers are advised to place these traps in a shaded area as soon as the first fruit is set and to not remove them until the end of harvest. The traps should be checked once a week and farmers should look for the spot on the wing of the males to determine if D. suzukii is present.

In areas where D. suzukii has already been established or where its activity has been monitored, there are different ways to control it. One way to manage D. suzukii is to remove the infested fruit and place it in a plastic bag in the garbage. This method is effective from removing D. suzukii from gardens and small areas but is difficult for farmers with larger operations to do this. Farmers can also harvest their soft fruit early which reduces the exposure of fruit to D. suzukii and the likelihood of damage.

Farmers have the option of both conventional and organic sprays to control D. suzukii. Timing of the sprays is important to effectively controlling it. Since D. suzukii is more active in the morning and evening those are the best times to control it. Sprays should be in place prior to egg laying and the coverage needs to be thorough because adults often hide in dense portion of the canopy. Depending on the variety of soft fruit and laws in different states and countries, there are many types of organic and conventional sprays that are effective. Different laws and pre-harvest date intervals need to be kept in mind when choosing a type of spray. Most types of sprays need to be applied each week, at a minimum. To prevent resistance to certain sprays, farmers must rotate among different insecticides.

Parasitoids 
 Ganaspis - The United States Department of Agriculture's Animal and Plant Health Inspection Service has approved and the biocontrol committee of the North American Plant Protection Organization has recommended the use of Ganaspis brasiliensis as a biocontrol for D. suzukii. G. brasiliensis has been widely studied by others as a potential biocontrol for D. suzukii. (However, there is some dispute as to whether it is G. brasiliensis that attacks D. suzukii or whether this is the D. suzukii-specialized host race of Ganaspis xanthopoda.)
 Asobara
 A. brevicauda
 A. elongata
 A. japonica, the most common in South Korea
 A. leveri
 A. mesocauda
 A. triangulata
 A. unicolorata
 Leptopilina
 L. decemflagella
 L. j. formosana
 L. japonica - First captured in November 2020 as bycatch from a Vespa mandarinia trap in Washington State - the first find of this species in the United States. This may help to control D. suzukii in North America.
 L. j. japonica
 Unspecified Leptopilina likely a sp. nov. by Buffington.
 Leptolamina spp.
 Unspecified new Figitidae genus related to Leptolamina
 Pachycrepoideus vindemiae
 Trichopria drosophilae
 Areotetes striatiferus, Yunnan Province, China
 Tanycarpa chors, Japan, two locations in China

Predators 
Earwigs, damsel bugs, spiders, ants, and Orius ("minute pirate bugs") especially O. insidiosus. Likely also ground beetles (Carabidae), crickets, green lacewings' larvae, rove beetles (Staphylinidae) especially Dalotia coriaria, birds, and mammals.

Microbiome 
Drosophila suzukii, like all insects, is host to a variety of microorganisms. The intestinal bacterial communities of adult and larval D. suzukii collected in its invasive range (USA), were found to be simple and mostly dominated by Tatumella spp. (Enterobacteriaceae).  This fly is also infected with a variety of viruses in the wild. Whilst sharing some natural viruses with its close relative D. melanogaster, D. suzukii also harbours a number of unique viruses specific to it alone. Yeasts also form an important part of the Drosophila microbiome, with a mutualistic relationships to yeast being described in other Drosophila species. The yeast species found to be most frequently associated with D. suzukii were Hanseniaspora uvarum, Metschnikowia pulcherrima, Pichia terricola, and P. kluyveri. Although certain fungal pathogens have been shown to experimentally infect D. suzukii, the wild fungal infections of D. suzukii remain to be explored comprehensively.

Gallery

References

External links 

 Pest Alert: Spotted Wing Drosophila, Oregon Department of Agriculture
 Oregon State University horticulture site
  Washington State University
 Michigan State University Spotted Wing Drosophila site
 Spotted wing drosophila on the UF / IFAS Featured Creatures Web site
 Species Profile - Spotted Wing Drosophila (Drosophila suzukii), National Invasive Species Information Center, United States National Agricultural Library.

Further reading

suzukii
Diptera of Asia
Insects of Southeast Asia
Agricultural pest insects
Taxa named by Shōnen Matsumura
Insects described in 1931
Invasive agricultural pests